Marc Francois Marie Litaudon (30 June 1926 – 27 September 2003) was a French sprinter. He competed in the men's 4 × 100 metres relay at the 1948 Summer Olympics.

References

1926 births
2003 deaths
Athletes (track and field) at the 1948 Summer Olympics
French male sprinters
Olympic athletes of France
People from Landau